Enderby v Frenchay Health Authority (1992) C-127/92 is an EU labour law, relevant for UK labour law, that concerns the justification test for unequal pay between men and women.

Facts
Dr Pamela Mary Enderby was a speech therapist. She received around 40% less pay than senior hospital pharmacists and clinical psychologists. She said she should have equal pay.
Tribunal held the difference came from different bargaining structures of the three professions, which were not in themselves discriminatory.

The Employment Appeal Tribunal dismissed her appeal. The Court of Appeal made a reference to the ECJ asking whether the separate bargaining structures could be an objective justification under (what is now) TFEU art 157. Also it asked whether it was the case that, ‘if the employer could establish that serious shortages in one of the comparator professions explained part, but not all, of the difference in pay, the whole or only part of that difference should be regarded as justified.’

Judgment
The ECJ in 1997 held that although the worker has the burden of proof, this cannot undermine enforcement of equal pay. Therefore when statistics show an appreciable difference between jobs of equal value, the burden passes to the employer to objectively justify the disparity.

See also

UK labour law
UK employment equality law
Agenda for Change

References

United Kingdom labour case law
Court of Justice of the European Union case law
1992 in case law
1992 in British law
European Union labour case law